The Edda Awards are the main national film and TV awards in Iceland, given annually since 1999. The Best Director winners are

References 

Edda Awards